Davie is a surname and a form of the masculine given name David. 

It can refer to:

Surname
 Alan Davie (1920-2014), Scottish painter and musician
 Alexander Edmund Batson Davie (1847-1889), Canadian politician and eighth Premier of British Columbia
 Art Davie, American businessman
 Bert Davie (1899-1979), Australian cricketer and Australian rules footballer
 Bob Davie (American football) (born 1954), American college football head coach, former player and sports commentator
 Bob Davie (ice hockey) (1912–1990), Canadian ice hockey player
 Daniel DeWitt Tompkins Davie (1816–1877), American photographer
 Donald Davie (1922–1995), English poet and literary critic
 Earl Davie (born 1927), American biochemist
 Elspeth Davie (1918-1995), Scottish novelist, short story writer, painter and art teacher, wife of George Elder Davie
 Erin Davie, American actress and singer
 Eugenie Mary Ladenburg Davie (1895-1975), American political activist
 George Elder Davie (1912–2007), Scottish philosopher and author of The Democratic Intellect
 George M. Davie (1848–1900), American lawyer and poet
 Grace Davie, British sociologist
 Harry Davie (1905-1968), Australian rules footballer
 Henry Ferguson Davie (1797-1885), British Army general and Member of Parliament
 Hutch Davie (born c. 1932), orchestra leader, pianist and composer of popular music
 John Davie (disambiguation)
 Michael Davie (1924–2005) was a British journalist and newspaper editor
 Preston Davie (1881–1967), American lawyer and colonel
 Sandy Davie (born 1945), Scottish retired football goalkeeper
 Scott Davie (disambiguation)
 Theodore Davie (1852-1898), Canadian lawyer, politician and jurist, tenth Premier of British Columbia and Chief Justice of the Supreme Court of British Columbia
 Tim Davie (born 1967), Chief Executive Officer of BBC Worldwide
 William Richardson Davie (1756-1820), one of the founding fathers of the United States, Revolutionary War officer and tenth Governor of North Carolina
 Willie Davie (1925–1996), Scottish footballer
 various Davie baronets

Given name
 Davie504 (born 1994), Italian Youtuber and bass guitarist
 Davie Allan, American rock guitarist
 David Bowie (1947–2016), English singer-songwriter credited as "Davie Jones" on his debut single
 David Davie Cattanach (born 1946), Scottish former footballer
 David Davie Cooper (1956–1995), Scottish footballer
 David Davie Dodds (born 1958), Scottish former footballer
 David Davie Duncan (1921–1991), Scottish footballer
 Edmund Davie Fulton (1916-2000), Canadian politician and judge
 Davie Irons, Scottish former footballer and coach
 Davie Kemp (born 1950), Scottish retired footballer
 David Davie Mathie (1919–1954), Scottish footballer
 David Davie Robb (born 1947), Scottish former footballer
 David Davie Russell (1868–1952), Scottish footballer
 Davie Selke (born 1995), German footballer
 Davie Sneddon (born 1936), Scottish former football player and manager
 David Davie Wilson (born 1939), Scottish former footballer

Places
 Davie, Florida
 Davie County, North Carolina
 Davie Village and Davie Street, a neighbourhood and street in Vancouver, British Columbia, Canada

See also
 Davey (disambiguation)

Masculine given names
Hypocorisms